Thermochromic ink (also called thermochromatic ink) is a type of dye that changes color when temperatures increase or decrease. Often used in the manufacture of many toys or product packaging, as well as thermometers. Thermochromic ink can also turn transparent when heat is applied; an example of this type of thermochromic ink is found on corners of an examination mark sheet. This proves that the sheet has not been edited or photocopied, and also on certain pizza boxes to show the temperature of the product.

Use on packaging can be to detect temperature history during shipping and to indicate proper heating in an oven.

Examples 
On June 20, 2017, the United States Postal Service released the first application of thermochromic ink to postage stamps in its Total Eclipse of the Sun Forever stamp to commemorate the solar eclipse of August 21, 2017. When pressed with a finger, body heat turns the black circle in the center of the stamp into an image of the full moon. The stamp image is a photo of a total solar eclipse seen in Jalu, Libya, on March 29, 2006. The photo was taken by retired NASA astrophysicist Fred Espenak, aka "Mr. Eclipse".

See also
 Thermochromism
Security printing
Active packaging

References

Thermochromism
Dyes